Banksia armata var. armata is a variety of shrub that is endemic to Western Australia. It differs from the other variety (Banksia armata var. ignicida) in having a lignotuber, narrower leaves with more side lobes and shorter flowers. It is also usually a shorter plant.

Description

Taxonomy and naming
Specimens of B. armata were first collected at King George Sound in December 1801 by Robert Brown. Brown published a description of the species in 1810, naming it Dryandra armata in the Transactions of the Linnean Society of London. The specific epithet (armata) is from the Latin armatus meaning "armed", in reference to the sharply serrated leaves. 

Thirty years later, John Lindley published a purported new species, which he named Dryandra favosa, published in A Sketch of the Vegetation of the Swan River Colony. Dryandra favosa was accepted as a species by Carl Meissner in 1845, but declared a taxonomic synonym of D. armata by him in 1856. The latter view was taken by George Bentham his 1870 Flora Australiensis.

In 1996, Alex George published Dryandra armata var. ignicida, thereby invoking the autonym D. armata var. armata. George also refined the synonymy of D. favosa to this subspecies. In 2007, all Dryandra species were transferred to Banksia by Austin Mast and Kevin Thiele and the change is accepted by the Australian Plant Census.

Distribution and habitat
This variety is widespread in the south-west, mainly between Mount Lesueur, Walpole and the Cape Arid National Park. It grows amongst open woodland and kwongan, usually on rocky soils.

Conservation status
This variety of B. armata is classified as "not threatened" by the Western Australian Government Department of Parks and Wildlife.

References

armata var. armata
Endemic flora of Western Australia